Refilwe Boingotlo Moeketsi (born 24 October 1991), known professionally as Fifi Cooper is a South African recording artist. Fifi Cooper started her music career as an R&B singer before her musical versatility saw her release her breakthrough rap single "Chechela Morago" in 2010. In 2015, she released her award-winning debut studio album 20FIFI.

Early life and education
Fifi Cooper is the last of three children. She had her early education in Montshiwa, Mahikeng, South Africa, where she also harnessed her ability in singing and dancing. She completed her secondary school education at Batswana High School, Mahikeng and her higher education at Boston Media House where she studied Media.

Career

2008–2014: Early beginnings
Fifi Cooper began singing at the age of 8 while in primary school; participating in various social extra-curricula activities. She professionally started her music career in 2008 when she made a guest appearance on Mo'Molemi's Motzamai: Rebel With a Pause album. Her breakthrough however came in 2010 following the release of her single titled "Chechela Morago", a rap song that received massive airplay and did well to gain her new grounds in the South African music industry. Fifi Cooper also made vocal appearances in the remix of AKA's "Baddest Remix" single, Mo'Molemi's album titled Asia, Khuli Chana's Lost in Time and Lection's Gentlemen's Club.

2015–2019: 20FIFI

In 2015, Fifi Cooper signed a recording contract with Ambitiouz Entertainment, a South Africa-based record label. In early 2015, she released an AB Crazy-produced song titled "Kisses". The music video for "Kisses" was directed by Dino Benedetti and was released on YouTube on 24 May 2015.

On 13 November 2015, Fifi Cooper released 20FIFI, her debut studio album which won three awards at the 15th Metro FM Music Awards and was further nominated in the "Best Newcomer of The Year" and "Best Female Artist of The Year" categories at the 2nd edition of the South African Music Awards. In February 2017, Fifi Cooper departed from Ambitiouz Entertainment along with A-Reece and the hip hop duo B3nchMarQ.

2020-present: Upcoming album
After the departure from her former record label, she founded  her own record label  Mo Cooper records and later then released her first album under her very own record label. The 21 track album titled "Take Me Back" which includes hit songs such as "Freedom & "Zwagala", features the likes of Thabsie, Moozlie, Towdeemac and Leon Lee to name a few.

In November 2020, Fifi Cooper released her first single "Net So" off of her upcoming 2021 album titled Chapters. The music video for "Net So" which was shot by Mo Cooper Visuals, is also written & directed by The Boss Lady herself.
On 11 March  2021, her single "Motlogeleng" was released. The song will  serve as lead single from her upcoming album.

Artistry
Regarded by the local media as the "Motswako first lady", Fifi Coopers' musical versatility can see her rap and sing. Credited as the vocalist on Khuli Chana's hit single "Mnatebawen", she does the hip hop and Motswako genres of music. In an interview with YoMzansi, Fifi Cooper describes her style of rap as "unpredictable, punchy and hearty".

Discography

Studio albums

Personal life
Fifi Cooper is a single mother, she has a son named Resego.

Awards and nominations

References

1991 births
Living people
South African women rappers
South African women singer-songwriters
People from Mahikeng
South African hip hop musicians